Adventures of Juan Lucas is a 1949 Spanish historical adventure film directed by Rafael Gil and starring Fernando Rey, Marie Déa and Manolo Morán. It consists of an adaptation of the Manuel Halcón's eponymous novel.

Cast

References

Bibliography 
  Eva Woods Peiró. White Gypsies: Race and Stardom in Spanish Musical Films. U of Minnesota Press, 2012.

External links 
 

1940s historical adventure films
Spanish historical adventure films
1949 films
1940s Spanish-language films
Films directed by Rafael Gil
Suevia Films films
Films scored by Juan Quintero Muñoz
Spanish black-and-white films
Peninsular War films
Guerrilla warfare in film
1940s Spanish films